Sandu Stelian Burcea (born 7 October 1983) is a Romanian rugby union player. He plays as a lock, flanker and number eight.

Burcea is a player and the captain for RC Timişoara in the Romanian Rugby Championship. He won the National Championship titles in 2011/12 and 2012/13. He is also player and captain for București Wolves, a team made from the best players at the Romanian Rugby Championship that competes at the European Challenge Cup.

He has 44 caps for Romania, since 2006, with 4 tries scored, 20 points on aggregate. Burcea first cap came at the 14-62 loss to France, in Bucharest, in a friendly game, at 17 June 2006, when he was 22 years old. He was called for the 2011 Rugby World Cup, playing in two games but without scoring. He played once again at the 2015 Rugby World Cup, being used in three games, but once again remaining scoreless.

References

External links

 
 
 

1983 births
Living people
Romanian rugby union players
Romania international rugby union players
SCM Rugby Timișoara players
București Wolves players
CSA Steaua București (rugby union) players
Rugby union number eights
Sportspeople from Pitești